Gard Kristiansen (born 3 May 1972) is a retired Norwegian football defender.

He grew up in the club Holter IF and was bought by the regional greats Lillestrøm SK in 1995 to play first-tier football. Not quite breaking into the first team, in 1997 he took one season on the second tier with Sarpsborg FK, before playing nine seasons in Moss FK, on the first and second tier interchangeably. He played  league games.

Ahead of the 2007 season he joined then-seventh-tier club SK Rapid as playing coach. In the latter half of 2007 he was loaned out to Eidsvoll TF. He then continued in Rapid until the latter half of the 2010 season, when he was recruited by Moss again to provide routine in training sessions for an injury-stricken team. Outside of football he worked as a schoolteacher.

He should not be confused with Gard Hellgren Kristiansen, who also played in the city of Moss, for local rivals Sprint-Jeløy.

References

1972 births
Living people
People from Nannestad
Norwegian footballers
Lillestrøm SK players
Sarpsborg FK players
Moss FK players
Eliteserien players
Norwegian First Division players
Association football defenders
Sportspeople from Viken (county)